Faintly Blowing is Kaleidoscope's second studio album released by Fontana Records in April 1969.

Though not as popular as the U.S. Kaleidoscope, this British band was also a band from the psychedelic movement with moderate domestic success, and just enough international exposure to have this album recognized in the genre's catalogue and regarded as one of the best in the same.

Track listing
All songs composed by Eddy Pumer (music) and Peter Daltrey (lyrics).
Side one
"Faintly Blowing" - 4:06
"Poem"
"Snapdragon"
"Story from Tom Bitz"
"(Love Song) for Annie"
"If You So Wish"

Side two
"Opinion"
"Bless the Executioner"
"Black Fjord"
"Feathered Tiger"
"I'll Kiss You Once"
"Music" - 5:56

Bonus tracks (Repertoire 2005)
"Do It Again For Jeffrey"
"Poem" (Single Version)
"Balloon"
"If You So Wish" (Mono Single Version)
"Let the World Wash In" (Released As I Luv Wight)
"Mediaeval Masquerade" (Released As I Luv Wight)

The album was re-released in 2011 by Sunbeam records with all the original artwork and a 12 pages inner-book with new photos and recording history written by Peter Daltrey.

Personnel
Peter Daltrey – vocals, keyboards
Eddy Pumer – guitar, keyboards
Steve Clark – bass, flute
Dan Bridgman – drums, percussion

References

External links
Album facts, info, lyrics and more

Kaleidoscope (British band) albums
1969 albums
Fontana Records albums